Amy Greer is an infectious disease epidemiologist. She is an associate professor in the Department of Population Medicine, Ontario Veterinary College at the University of Guelph. Greer is a Canada Research Chair (Tier 2) in Population Disease Modeling.

Biography 
Greer completed her PhD in infectious disease ecology at Arizona State University, and postdoctoral training at the Hospital for Sick Children. Previously, she was an assistant professor at the University of Toronto's Dalla Lana School Of Public Health, and held a Senior Mathematician role in the Centre for Communicable Diseases and Infection Control at the Public Health Agency of Canada.

Greer's research involves developing computer simulation models to identify the effective surveillance and control strategies for preventing infectious disease outbreaks. During the COVID-19 pandemic, Greer led various research efforts, including a survey of 4,981 Canadians in May 2020 to understand attitudes and behaviours towards the Canadian COVID-19 public health response, which found that more than half were unable to self-isolate and stay home from work when necessary. Greer has spoken about different aspects of the COVID-19 pandemic, including COVID-19 testing, in-person learning in schools, and public health practices, for multiple media outlets.

In October 2020, Greer received a Minister of Colleges and Universities Award of Excellence by Minister Ross Romano. This award recognizes Greer's dedication to the local community, post-secondary students and the post-secondary sector during the pandemic.

Greer has published over 100 academic publications, which have been cited over 2,000 times, resulting in an h-index and i10-index of 23 and 36 respectively.

Selected academic publications 

 Mathematical modelling of COVID-19 transmission and mitigation strategies in the population of Ontario, Canada. Ashleigh R Tuite, David N Fisman, Amy L Greer. Canadian Medical Association Journal. 2020.
 Estimated epidemiologic parameters and morbidity associated with pandemic H1N1 influenza. Ashleigh R Tuite, Amy L Greer, Michael Whelan, Anne-Luise Winter, Brenda Lee, Ping Yan, Jianhong Wu, Seyed Moghadas, David Buckeridge, Babak Pourbohloul, David N Fisman. Canadian Medical Association Journal. 2010.
 Climate change and infectious diseases in North America: the road ahead. Amy Greer, Victoria Ng, David Fisman. Canadian Medical Association Journal. 2008.
 Five amphibian mortality events associated with ranavirus infection in south central Ontario, Canada. Amy L Greer, Michael Berrill, Paul J Wilson. Diseases of aquatic organisms. 2005.

References 

Living people
21st-century Canadian women scientists
American women epidemiologists
American epidemiologists
Arizona State University alumni
Canadian women epidemiologists
Year of birth missing (living people)